Tosin is a village in central Poland.

Tosin or Tošin (Serbian Cyrillic: Тошин) may also refer to:

 Tosin (given name)
 Tošin Bunar, an urban neighborhood of Belgrade, Serbia 
 Tošin Bunar railway station